Henri Messerer (19 May 1838 – 5 October 1923) was a French organist and composer. The Rue Henri Messerer in his hometown of Marseille was named in his honour.

References

Bach-Messerer Chaconne in d (for organ) http://www.editions-delatour.com/en/organ-e-score/3519-chaconne-for-violin-adapted-for-great-organ-e-score-pdf-9790232146553.html

1838 births
1923 deaths
19th-century French composers
19th-century French male musicians
20th-century French composers
20th-century French male musicians
French classical organists
French male organists
Musicians from Marseille
Male classical organists